Özkök is a Turkish surname. Notable people with the surname include:

 Ertuğrul Özkök (born 1947), Turkish journalist
 Hilmi Özkök (born 1940), Turkish general
 İpek Özkök (born 1982), Turkish actress and model

Turkish-language surnames